Ken Turner is a New Zealand politician who is an Auckland Councillor. In 2022, Turner was elected as one of two councillors representing the Waitākere ward.

Early life

Turner is a fourth-generation West Aucklander, growing up in Titirangi. He has worked as a motor mechanic since 1975. Turner's workshop in Woodlands Park was the site of the former bus depot for Laingholm bus services.

Political career

Turner ran unsuccessfully for the Waitākere Ranges Local Board in the 2013 Auckland local board elections, and in the 2016 Auckland local elections ran unsuccessfully for the position of Waitākere ward councillor. Turner was elected to the Waitākere Ranges Local Board in 2018 after a by-election caused by the death of Denise Yates. For the remainder of the term, he was the only member of the Westwards ticket sitting on the local board.

In the 2022 local body elections, Turner was elected as one of two councillors for the Waitākere ward. Turner also ran for the Waitākere Ranges Local Board and was the candidate who received the highest number of votes, however his position was given to Future West candidate Mark Allen, after successfully winning the election to become a councillor.

Personal life 

Turner lives in the coastal settlement of Huia.

References

Auckland Councillors
Living people
Mechanics (people)
Year of birth missing (living people)